Leslie Birgit Vosshall (born July 5, 1965) is an American neurobiologist and currently an Howard Hughes Medical Institute (HHMI) Investigator and the Robin Chemers Neustein Professor of Neurogenetics and Behavior at The Rockefeller University. In 2022 she was appointed Chief Scientific Officer and vicepresident of HHMI. She is also the director of the Kavli Neural Systems Institute at The Rockefeller University. Vosshall, a member of the National Academy of Sciences, is known for her contributions to the field of olfaction, particularly for the discovery and subsequent characterization of the insect olfactory receptor family, and the genetic basis of chemosensory behavior in mosquitoes. She has also extended her research into the study of human olfaction, revealing parts of human genetic olfactory architecture, and finding variations in odorant receptors that determine individuals’ abilities to detect odors.

Early life 
Leslie Vosshall was born in Lausanne, Switzerland where she spent most of her early childhood. Vosshall moved to New Jersey when she was 8 years old. She spent summers from age 17 to 19 in her uncle, Philip Dunham's, summer laboratory with Gerald Weissmann at the Marine Biological Laboratory (MBL) in Woods Hole. Vosshall said this experience was "an incredible introduction to the practice of science."

Education 
Vosshall received her B.A. in Biochemistry from Columbia University in 1987 and her Ph.D. from Rockefeller University in 1993. She then returned to Columbia for a postdoctoral fellowship in the laboratory of future Nobel laureate Richard Axel from 1993-1997. She then worked in the position of Associate Research Scientist in Dr. Axel's laboratory from 1997-2000. Vosshall was offered the position of Assistant Professor at The Rockefeller University in 2000, and was promoted to Associate Professor in 2006. In April 2010, she was granted tenure and is currently the Robin Chemers Neustein Professor and Head of the Laboratory of Neurogenetics and Behavior. She served as Associate Director of the Kavli Neural Systems Institute from 2015-2016 and was promoted to Director in 2016.

Research 
Vosshall’s laboratory studies three organisms: fruit flies, mosquitoes and humans, to understand the genetic and molecular underpinnings, as well as behavioral mechanisms, involved in olfaction and feeding behavior. In addition, to find the genes that make the mosquito species Aedes aegypti prefer humans, Vosshall compares genes that drive host-seeking and blood-seeking behaviors in several different mosquito subspecies. Vosshall’s and her associates’ research on Aedes aegypti, the mosquito responsible for transmitting yellow fever, dengue, and Zika, found that it has a particular odor-detecting gene (AaegOr4) that is highly attuned to sulcatone, a compound predominant in human odor. Research from Vosshall’s lab demonstrated that a chemical transferred from the male of the species during sex plays a key role in shaping the female’s sexual proclivities. In addition, Vosshall and her associates discovered ORCO, a mosquito co-receptor responsible for preference for humans over non-human animals and sensitivity to insect-repellent DEET.

Awards and honors
 Beckman Young Investigator Award (2001)
 McKnight Neuroscience Scholar Award (2001)
 National Science Foundation Early Career Development Award (2001)
 John Merck Fund Scholar (2002)
 Presidential Early Career Award for Scientists and Engineers (2002)
 New York City Mayor’s Award for Excellence in Science and Technology (2005)
 Irma T. Hirschl/Monique Weill-Caulier Trust Research Award (2005)
 Blavatnik Award for Young Scientists (2007). 
 Howard Hughes Medical Institute investigator (2008) 
 Lawrence C. Katz Prize, Duke University (2009)
 Dart/NYU Biotechnology Achievement Award (2010)  
 Gill Young Investigator Award (2011)
 Member, National Academy of Sciences (2015)
 Pradel Research Award (2020)
 Member, National Academy of Medicine (2021)

Key papers

Larsson MC, Domingos AI, Jones WD, Chiappe ME, Amrein H, Vosshall LB (September 2 2004). "Or83b Encodes a Broadly Expressed Odorant Receptor Essential for Drosophila Olfaction". Neuron. 43 (5): 703–714. doi:10.1016/j.neuron.2004.08.019. ISSN 0896-6273

Other selected publications
McBride, C.S. et al. Evolution of mosquito preference for humans linked to an odorant receptor. Nature 515, 222–227 (2014).
Bushdid, C. et al. Humans can discriminate more than 1 trillion olfactory stimuli. Science 343, 1370–1372 (2014).
McMeniman, C.J. et al. Multimodal Integration of Carbon Dioxide and Other Sensory Cues Drives Mosquito Attraction to Humans. Cell 156,1060-1071 (2014).

References

External links
Rockefeller news search results for Leslie Vosshall
HHMI: Leslie B. Vosshall, Ph.D. (biography)
Rockefeller: Vosshall Lab Web Page

American medical researchers
American neuroscientists
American women neuroscientists
American expatriates in Switzerland
Rockefeller University people
Columbia College (New York) alumni
Rockefeller University alumni
Howard Hughes Medical Investigators
1965 births
Living people
Scientists from Lausanne
Members of the National Academy of Medicine
21st-century American women scientists
21st-century American biologists